Lovers' Requiem is the debut album by the rock band I Am Ghost. It was released on October 10, 2006 by Epitaph Records, and is the band's first full-length album. It is a concept album of "a love story between angels and demons, heaven and hell, good and evil."

Track listing

Chart positions

Credits
 Michael "Elvis" Baskette - producer & mixing
 Dave Holderedge - engineer & mixing
 Jef Moll - digital editing
 Steve Juliano - Lead Vocals, Screams, and Gang Vocals
 Kerith Telestai - Vocals, Violin, Strings, Choral Vocals, Operatic Solo on "The River Styx", Orchestral and Choral Composition
 Tim Rosales III - Lead Guitar and Gang Vocals 
 Gabe Iraheta - Rhythm Guitar, Programming, and Gang Vocals
 Brian Telestai - Bass, Vocals, Piano, Keyboard, Choral Vocals, Operatic Solo on "The River Styx", Orchestral and Choral Composition 
 Ryan Seaman - Drums and Gang Vocals

Making of the album
 Studio Diary Part 1 (Teaser)
 Studio Diary Part 2 (Production)
 Studio Diary Part 3 (Bass)
 Studio Diary Part 4 (Guitar)
 Studio Diary Part 5 (Violin)
 Studio Diary Part 6 (Vocals)

References

External links
 Epitaph Records album page
 I Am Ghost Official Website
 Watch "Our Friend Lazarus Sleeps" on YouTube
 Watch "Lovers' Requiem" Live on MySpaceTV
 Watch "Lovers' Requiem" Album Commercial on MySpaceTV

2006 debut albums
I Am Ghost albums
Epitaph Records albums
Albums produced by Michael Baskette